Sami Olavi Kallunki (27 April 1971 – 2 December 1999) was a Finnish skier. He competed in the Nordic combined event at the 1992 Winter Olympics. Kallunki committed suicide in 1999.

References

External links
 

1971 births
1999 suicides
Finnish male Nordic combined skiers
Olympic Nordic combined skiers of Finland
Nordic combined skiers at the 1992 Winter Olympics
People from Kuusamo
Suicides in Finland
Sportspeople from North Ostrobothnia
20th-century Finnish people